The Lake Superior agate is a type of agate stained by iron and found on the shores of Lake Superior. Its wide distribution and iron-rich bands of color reflect the gemstone's geologic history in Minnesota, Wisconsin, Nebraska, Iowa, Kansas and Michigan. In 1969 the Lake Superior agate was designated by the Minnesota Legislature as the official state gemstone.

The Lake Superior agate was selected because the agate reflects many aspects of Minnesota. It was formed during lava eruptions that occurred in Minnesota about a billion years ago. The stone's predominant red color comes from iron, a major Minnesota industrial mineral found extensively throughout the Iron Range region. Finally, the Lake Superior agate can be found in many regions of Minnesota as it was distributed by glacial movement across Minnesota 10,000 to 15,000 years ago.

Geologic history

More than a billion years ago, the North American continent began to split apart along plate boundaries. Magma upwelled into iron-rich lava flows throughout the Midcontinent Rift System, including what is now the Minnesota Iron Range region. These flows are now exposed along the north and south shores of Lake Superior.  The tectonic forces that attempted to pull the continent apart, and which left behind the lava flows, also created the Superior trough, a depressed region that became the basin of Lake Superior.

The lava flows formed the conditions for creation of Lake Superior agates. As the lava solidified, water vapor and carbon dioxide trapped within the solidified flows formed a vesicular texture (literally millions of small bubbles). Later, groundwater transported ferric iron, silica, and other dissolved minerals passed through the trapped gas vesicles. These quartz-rich groundwater solutions deposited concentric bands of fine-grained quartz called chalcedony, or embedded agates.

Over the next billion years, erosion exposed a number of the quartz-filled, banded vesicles—agates—were freed by running water and chemical disintegration of the lavas, since these vesicles were now harder than the lava rocks that contained them. The vast majority, however, remained lodged in the lava flows until the next major geologic event that changed them and Minnesota.

During the ensuing ice ages a lobe of glacial ice, the Superior lobe, moved into Minnesota through the agate-filled Superior trough. The glacier picked up surface agates and transported them south. Its crushing action and cycle of freezing and thawing at its base also freed many agates from within the lava flows and transported them, too. The advancing glacier acted like an enormous rock tumbler, abrading, fracturing, and rough-polishing the agates.

Description

The Lake Superior agate is noted for its rich red, orange, and yellow coloring. This color scheme is caused by the oxidation of iron. Iron leached from rocks provided the pigment that gives the gemstone its beautiful array of color. The concentration of iron and the amount of oxidation determine the color within or between an agate's bands. There can also be white, grey, black and tan strips of color as well.

The gemstone comes in various sizes. The gas pockets in which the agates formed were primarily small, about 1 cm in diameter. A few Lake Superior agates have been found that are 22 cm in diameter  with a mass exceeding 10 kilograms. Very large agates are extremely rare.

The most common type of Lake Superior agate is the fortification agate with its eye-catching banding patterns. Each band, when traced around an exposed pattern or "face," connects with itself like the walls of a fort, hence the name fortification agate.

A common subtype of the fortification agate is the parallel-banded, onyx-fortification or water-level agate. Perfectly straight, parallel bands occur over all or part of these stones. The straight bands were produced by puddles of quartz-rich solutions that crystallized inside the gas pocket under very low fluid pressure. The parallel nature of the bands also indicates the agate's position inside the lava flow.

Probably the most popular Lake Superior agate is also one of the rarest. The highly treasured eye agate has perfectly round bands or "eyes" dotting the surface of the stone.

Cutting and polishing

A gemstone can be used as a jewel when cut and polished. Only a fraction of the Lake Superior agate  are of the quality needed for lapidary. Three lapidary techniques are used on Lake Superior agates:
 Tumbling—Small gemstones are rotated in drums with progressively finer polishing grit for several days until they are smooth and reflective.
 Saw-cut and polish—Stones up to 1/2 kg are cut with diamond saws into thin slabs, which then are cut into various shapes. One side of the shaped slab is polished producing fine jewelry pieces and collectible gems called cabochons. (Note the value of large Lake superior agates, which weigh a few pounds or more, will lose most of their value if cut into slabs.)
 Face polishing—Polishing a curved surface on a portion of the stone and leaving the major portion in its natural state is called face polishing.

Distribution of Lake Superior agate
One of the most appealing reasons for naming the Lake Superior agate as the Minnesota state gemstone is its general availability. Glacial activity spread agates throughout northeastern and central Minnesota, northwestern Wisconsin, Northern Iowa, Nebraska, Kansas and Michigan's Upper Peninsula in the United States and the area around Thunder Bay in Northwestern Ontario, Canada. Lake Superior agates have been found in gravel deposits along the Mississippi River basin. Other types of agate similar to Lake Superior agate have been found in southwestern Wisconsin.

References

 Minnesota's State Gem: The Lake Superior Agate

Agates
Symbols of Minnesota
Geology of Minnesota
Geology of Wisconsin
Geology of Iowa
Geology of Michigan
Geology of Ontario
Lake Superior